Amarpatan Assembly constituency is one of the 230 Vidhan Sabha (Legislative Assembly) constituencies of Madhya Pradesh state in central India. This constituency came into existence in 1951, as one of the 48 Vidhan Sabha constituencies of the erstwhile Vindhya Pradesh state.

Overview
Amarpatan (constituency number 66) is one of the 7 Vidhan Sabha constituencies located in Satna district. This constituency covers the entire Ramnagar tehsil, Amarpatan nagar panchayat and part of Amarpatan tehsil of the district.

Amarpatan is part of Satna Lok Sabha constituency along with six other Vidhan Sabha segments of this district, namely, Chitrakoot, Raigaon, Satna, Nagod, Maihar and Rampur-Baghelan.

Members of Legislative Assembly

As from a constituency of Madhya Bharat
 1951: Lal Bihari Singh, Indian National Congress

As a constituency of Madhya Pradesh

Election Results

2018 results

References

Satna district
Assembly constituencies of Madhya Pradesh